Colonel Henry George Herbert, 2nd Earl of Carnarvon DL, FSA (3 June 1772 – 16 April 1833), styled The Honourable Henry Herbert from 1780 to 1793 and Lord Porchester from 1793 to 1811, was a British peer, nobleman, and Whig politician.

Background and education
Born in Hill Street in London, Herbert was the oldest son of Henry Herbert, 1st Earl of Carnarvon, and Lady Elizabeth Alicia Maria Wyndham, the oldest daughter of Charles Wyndham, 2nd Earl of Egremont. He was baptised in St George's, Hanover Square on 22 June 1772. His younger brothers were the sailor Charles Herbert and the botanist William Herbert. Another brother, Algernon Herbert was an antiquary. Herbert was educated at Eton until 1789.

Career
Herbert joined the Royal Wiltshire Militia as captain in 1790 and when the West Somerset Yeomanry was raised in 1794 became its major. He was promoted to lieutenant-colonel four years later and obtained colonelcy of the regiment in 1803. Having been elected for Cricklade, Herbert entered the British House of Commons in 1794. After the Act of Union 1801 he represented the constituency then in the Parliament of the United Kingdom until 1811, when he succeeded his father as earl. During his time as Member of Parliament he stirred an investigation into the failure of the Walcheren Campaign in 1809. Herbert was nominated a Deputy Lieutenant for the county of Somerset in 1803 and served as High Steward of Newbury. He was chosen a fellow of the Society of Antiquaries of London in 1814 and was vice-president of the Royal Horticultural Society.

Marriage and children

On 26 April 1796, he married the heiress Elizabeth "Kitty" Acland (d.1813), at St George's Hanover Square. She was the only daughter and eventual heiress of Col. John Dyke Acland (1747–1778), son and heir apparent of Sir Thomas Dyke Acland, 7th Baronet (1722–1785) of Killerton, Devon, and Petherton Park in Somerset, who acquired Pixton Park, Tetton, Kingston St Mary, and Holnicote, Setworthy by his marriage to the heiress Elizabeth Dyke (d.1753). Her brother was Sir John Dyke Acland, 8th Baronet, who died aged 7. Carnarvon inherited from his wife the substantial Somerset estates of Pixton and Tetton. Kitty died at Shooter's Hill in 1813; Herbert survived her for twenty years until 1833. By his wife he had five children, three daughters and two sons.

 Lady Harriet Elizabeth Herbert (b. 1797), who married Rev. J. C. Stapylton.
 Henry John George Herbert, 3rd Earl of Carnarvon (1800–1849), who married Henrietta Anna Howard-Molyneux-Howard, eldest daughter of Lord Henry Howard-Molyneux-Howard
 Hon. Edward Charles Hugh Herbert (1802–1852), who married Elizabeth Sweet-Escott, daughter of Prebendary Thomas Sweet-Escott. They had two sons.
 Lady Theresa Elizabeth Mary Herbert (1803–1815)
 Lady Emily Frances Theresa Herbert (d. 1854), who married Philip Bouverie-Pusey, paternal grandson of Jacob des Bouverie, 1st Viscount Folkestone and maternal grandson of Robert Sherard, 4th Earl of Harborough. They had one son, and two daughters.

Death and burial
He died, aged 60, at his London residence in Grosvenor Square and was buried at Burghclere in Hampshire. He was succeeded in his titles by his eldest son, Henry.

Porchester's Post

The westernmost boundary of the historic estate of Pixton Park in Somerset is marked by "Porchester's Post", a 10-foot high oak obelisk first erected in 1796 for that purpose, by the 2nd Earl of Carnarvon, of Highclere Castle in Hampshire, husband of Elizabeth "Kitty" Acland, heiress of Pixton, whom he had married that year. He was then aged 24 and until his father's death in 1811 was known by his courtesy title of Lord Porchester. It is located high up on Exmoor between Withypool Hill and Halscombe Allotment (grid reference SS 828 334), 7 miles north-west of Pixton Park. It was renewed and re-erected in 2002 by the Exmoor National Park Authority. A brass plaque attached to it is inscribed as follows:
"First erected in 1796 to mark the boundary of the Carnarvon Estate. Re-erected in memory of Lord Porchester, Earl of Carnarvon, the Chairman of the 1977 inquiry into the protection of moorland on Exmoor and to commemorate the Golden Jubilee of Queen Elizabeth II in 2002".

Notes

References

External links
 [this link is well meaning but WRONG].

1772 births
1833 deaths
British MPs 1790–1796
British MPs 1796–1800
Deputy Lieutenants of Somerset
2
Fellows of the Society of Antiquaries of London
Henry Herbert, 02nd Earl of Carnarvon
Members of the Parliament of Great Britain for Cricklade
Members of the Parliament of the United Kingdom for Cricklade
People educated at Eton College
UK MPs 1801–1802
UK MPs 1802–1806
Military personnel from London
UK MPs 1806–1807
UK MPs 1807–1812
UK MPs who inherited peerages
West Somerset Yeomanry officers